Elaine Toms may refer to:
Elaine G. Toms, Canadian and British information scientist
M. Elaine Toms (1917–2019), Korean-born American physicist